Ano Liosia Olympic Hall is a multi-purpose and multi-sport indoor arena that is located in Ano Liosia, a suburb of Athens, Greece. The arena was mainly used to host various martial arts tournaments but from 2021 its used by AEK B.C. for its home games in the Greek Basket League and the Basketball Champions League. The arena's seating capacity for sporting events is 8,327 people.

History

Athens 2004 and the years after 
Ano Liosia Olympic Hall was opened in 2004. The arena was used to host the judo and wrestling events at the 2004 Athens Summer Olympics.

After the 2004 Athens Summer Olympics, the venue became the site of various television productions, including the Greek version of the reality show So You Think You Can Dance. From 19 May to 6 June 2010, the arena hosted the Greek Ice Hockey Championship, for both men and women. At one point in time, the arena was scheduled to be the home of the Hellenic Academy of Culture and Hellenic Digital Archive.

AEK B.C. 
On May 13, 2019, the Greek Government decided to cede the venue to the General Secretariat of Sports, with the aim of subsequently ceding it to AEK B.C. On June 22, 2020, it was announced that the arena's use until the year 2040, was granted to the professional basketball club A.E.K., of the Greek Basket League, in order for the arena to host the home games of the club. The club will begin using the arena for the 2021–22 season.
On 18 November the Hall's Gymnasium was named Gymnastirio Stevan Jelovac.

Gallery

See also
List of indoor arenas in Greece
AEK B.C.#Arenas

References

External links

Αυτοψία στο "παλάτι" των Άνω Λιοσίων που θέλει να κάνει σπίτι της η ΚΑΕ ΑΕΚ 
Video of Ano Liosia Olympic Hall 

Basketball venues in Greece
Fyli
Handball venues in Greece
Indoor arenas in Greece
Olympic judo venues
Olympic wrestling venues
Sports venues in Athens
Venues of the 2004 Summer Olympics
Volleyball venues in Greece

de:Wettkampforte der Olympischen Sommerspiele 2004#Ano Liossia Olympic Hall